The Milan Triennial XV was the Triennial in Milan sanctioned by the Bureau of International Expositions (BIE) held in 1973.

Contributors
The director of the International Architecture section was Aldo Rossi with Bonicalzi, Braghieri, Franco Raggi, Massimo Scolari and Daniele Vitale.

In September Friedensreich Hundertwasser planted 15 trees in Via Manzoni apartments.

Giorgio de Chirico created the "Mysterious Baths Fountain" in Parco Sempione.

The architect Richard Meier was another contributor.

References 

1973 in Italy
Tourist attractions in Milan
World's fairs in Milan